Paul J. Ricci (April 6, 1914 – January 24, 2001) was an American jazz reedist.

Early life 
Ricci was born in New York City. He played clarinet and saxophone in local dance halls as a teenager.

Career 
By the early 1930s, Ricci was playing professionally with Lud Gluskin, Joe Haymes, Bob Howard, Red McKenzie, Red Nichols, Adrian Rollini, and Joe Venuti. He worked extensively as a session musician for recordings and broadcasts from the 1940s through the 1960s, for NBC, Paramount, and Universal. Among his later associations are with Yank Lawson, Bobby Hackett, Russ Case, Brad Gowans, Jerry Jerome, Herbie Fields, Lucky Millinder, Deane Kincaide, Bob Crosby, Jimmy Dorsey, Jerry Gray, Billy Butterfield, Enoch Light, Carl Kress, Billie Holiday, and the big bands of Dizzy Gillespie and Benny Goodman.

References
Footnotes

General references
"Paul Ricci". The New Grove Dictionary of Jazz. 2nd edition, ed. Barry Kernfeld.

American jazz clarinetists
American jazz saxophonists
American male saxophonists
Musicians from New York (state)
1914 births
2001 deaths
20th-century American saxophonists
20th-century American male musicians
American male jazz musicians